J. Stuart Moore is the co-founder and a member of the board of directors of Sapient, headquartered in Boston, Massachusetts. He was co-chairman and co-CEO until June 1, 2006.

Moore has a degree in computer science from the University of California, Berkeley.

External links
Sapient website

References

American computer businesspeople
Living people
Year of birth missing (living people)
University of California, Berkeley alumni